Downs is a city in Osborne County, Kansas, United States.  As of the 2020 census, the population of the city was 800.

History
Downs had its start in the year 1879 when the Central Branch Railroad was extended to that point. It was named for William F. Downs, a railroad official from Atchison. Downs became an incorporated town in December of the same year. In 1910, the city had a population of 1,427. Business included 2 newspapers, a public library, flour mills, grain elevators, and an opera house.

Geography
Downs is located at  (39.503305, -98.543500).

Demographics

2010 census
As of the census of 2010, there were 900 people, 424 households, and 239 families residing in the city. The racial makeup of the city was 97.6% White, 0.1% African American, 1.1% Native American, 0.6% Asian, and 0.7% from two or more races. Hispanic or Latino of any race were 0.9% of the population.

There were 424 households, of which 23.3% had children under the age of 18 living with them, 44.6% were married couples living together, 9.4% had a female householder with no husband present, 2.4% had a male householder with no wife present, and 43.6% were non-families. 39.9% of all households were made up of individuals, and 18.4% had someone living alone who was 65 years of age or older. The average household size was 2.04 and the average family size was 2.68.

The median age in the city was 49.5 years. 20.2% of residents were under the age of 18; 5.9% were between the ages of 18 and 24; 17.1% were from 25 to 44; 30.8% were from 45 to 64; and 26% were 65 years of age or older. The gender makeup of the city was 47.3% male and 52.7% female.

2000 census
As of the census of 2000, there were 1,038 people, 474 households, and 273 families residing in the city. The racial makeup of the city was 98.75% White, 0.67% Native American, 0.29% Asian, 0.10% from other races, and 0.19% from two or more races. Hispanic or Latino of any race were 0.48% of the population.

There were 474 households, out of which 23.0% had children under the age of 18 living with them, 48.1% were married couples living together, 6.8% had a female householder with no husband present, and 42.4% were non-families. 38.8% of all households were made up of individuals, and 20.5% had someone living alone who was 65 years of age or older. The average household size was 2.08 and the average family size was 2.77.

In the city, the population was spread out, with 21.5% under the age of 18, 6.7% from 18 to 24, 20.2% from 25 to 44, 22.4% from 45 to 64, and 29.2% who were 65 years of age or older. The median age was 46 years. For every 100 females, there were 91.5 males. For every 100 females age 18 and over, there were 82.3 males.

The median income for a household in the city was $24,808, and the median income for a family was $36,518. Males had a median income of $24,940 versus $16,302 for females. The per capita income for the city was $15,001. About 9.0% of families and 11.1% of the population were below the poverty line, including 5.5% of those under age 18 and 15.2% of those age 65 or over.

Education
The community is served by Waconda USD 272 public school district.  The district elementary school is Lakeside Elementary School in Cawker City. The district high school is Lakeside High School in Downs, with the mascot Knights.

School unification combined Downs and Waconda East schools into USD 272 in 2003. The combined high school became Lakeside Jr./Sr. High School located in Downs.

Downs High School was closed through school unification. The Downs High School mascot was Dragons. The Downs Dragons won the following Kansas State High School championships:
 1938 Boys Basketball - Class B 
 1950 Boys Basketball - Class B 
 1988 Boys Cross Country - Class 2-1A 

Previously the community had Downs Elementary School and Downs Junior High School.

Notable people
 Francis Schmidt, football and basketball coach

See also
 Meades Ranch Triangulation Station, the geodetic base point for the North American Datum of 1927 (NAD 27), which was used as a reference point until 1983.
 Waconda Lake and Glen Elder State Park.

References

Further reading

External links

 City of Downs
 Downs - Directory of Public Officials
 Historic Images of Downs, Wichita State University Library
 Downs city map, KDOT

Cities in Kansas
Cities in Osborne County, Kansas
1879 establishments in Kansas
Populated places established in 1879